Troy Mills is an unincorporated community in Adair County, in the U.S. state of Missouri.

History
A post office called Troy Mills was established in 1868, and remained in operation until 1879. The community took its name from a nearby woolen mill.

References

Unincorporated communities in Adair County, Missouri
Unincorporated communities in Missouri